The Ambassador Extraordinary and Plenipotentiary of the Russian Federation to the Federal Democratic Republic of Ethiopia is the official representative of the Government of Russia to the Government of Ethiopia.

The ambassador and his staff work at large in the Embassy of Russia in Addis Ababa. The ambassador to Ethiopia is concurrently appointed as the Russian representative to the African Union.

Background 

Russia established diplomatic relations with Ethiopia on 9 August 1897 and sent its first head of mission, P. M. Vlasov. The successful development of Russo-Ethiopian relations, at least at the first stage (until 1907), was mainly due to the fact that Russia did not participate in the colonial division of Africa and therefore did not pose any threat to Ethiopia. Russia was the great global power and thus a country like Ethiopia needed an ally to continue its existence. As a rival of British Empire and Italy in global and regional politics, Russia objectively became in Ethiopia a political counterbalance to the imperialist plans of these powers. The Russian mission was tasked with "gaining the trust of the Negus and, if possible, protecting him from the intrigues of our political rivals, especially the British, who pursue such ambitious, predatory goals in Africa."

With the end of the tsarist regime in 1917 the diplomatic relations were interrupted, but were resumed by the Soviet Union on 21 April 1943. The first Soviet ambassador, arrived in the country on 9 March 1944.

List of representatives (1944 – present)

Representatives of the Soviet Union to Ethiopia (1944 – 1991)

Representatives of the Russian Federation to Ethiopia (1991 – present)

See also 
 Foreign relations of Ethiopia
 List of diplomatic missions in Ethiopia
 Current Ambassadors of Russia

References

External links 

 Embassy of Russia in Addis Ababa, Ethiopia

Ethiopia
Ambassadors of Russia to Ethiopia
Russia